William Brookes School is a mixed secondary school and sixth form located in Much Wenlock in the English county of Shropshire. The school is named after William Penny Brookes, a surgeon, magistrate, botanist, and educationalist from Much Wenlock especially known for inspiring the modern Olympic Games with the Wenlock Olympian Games. The school serves a community of small villages as well as the larger town of Broseley.

Previously a community school administered by Shropshire Council, William Brookes School converted to academy status in June 2013. However the school continues to coordinate with Shropshire Council for admissions. The school offers GCSEs, BTECs and vocational courses as programmes of study for pupils, while students in the sixth form have the option to study from a range of A-levels.

The Edge Arts Centre is also located at William Brookes School. The centre offers cinema, theatre, dance, music, comedy, literature performances for the local community, as well as student productions.

History
Wenlock Modern School opened in 1953 on the site of the original modern Olympic Games.. The initial intake of students in 1953 was 240 from 10 local primary schools. The intake became 364 in 1971, meaning the school was required to be considerably extended. The original building was extended and modernised various times during its use to be able to cope with the growing demand despite the building deteriorating drastically over the years. An outdoor swimming pool for local schools and the public was built in 1966 and a sports hall was opened in 1975. The secondary modern school later was renamed William Brookes School and became a comprehensive school for 11-16 year olds in 1970. It acquired a small sixth form in 1974. 

William Brookes School underwent a £27 million rebuilding programme in order to accomplish maximum quality 21st century education. Construction of the new school started in late 2008 and was later completed in August 2010.

In March 2017 the school was placed in special measures after an Ofsted report said the school was failing to give its pupils an acceptable standard of education and the persons responsible for leading, managing or governing the school were not demonstrating the capacity to secure the necessary improvement in the school. After 8 months, the school was removed from special measures and was rated ‘good’ overall.

House System
Students in years 7-11 are divided into 4 houses: Athens, Beijing, London and Sydney. Siblings are usually placed in the same house. Each house contains 10 tutorial groups with 20 students each of mixed years. Throughout the year, the houses compete in various interhouse sporting activities and gain points through accelerated reader to win a non-uniform day or other rewards. In the summer, the houses compete in sports day of which the result is usually announced on the last day of school before the summer break.

Sixth Form

Many students who attend William Brookes School Sixth Form, previously attended the academy in Years 7-11. However, the sixth form does accept a minority of students from the Telford and Shropshire region who did not previously attend the school. The small sixth form has a capacity of 160 students with 24% of students graduating with A-A* grades. The centre offers over 20 A-level courses.

Notable alumni
Steve Perks, professional footballer notably for Shrewsbury Town
Ben Simons, British Bobsleigher and former athlete

References

External links
William Brookes School official website
The Edge Arts Centre official website
William Brookes School official twitter

Secondary schools in Shropshire
Academies in Shropshire
Much Wenlock